Sandy Sidhu is a Canadian film and television actress based in Vancouver, British Columbia. She is known for her leading role as Nazneen Khan in the medical drama series Nurses (2020–present).

Early life
Sidhu was born in Nanaimo, British Columbia, Canada, and is of Indian descent. She began acting at the age of 14. She then moved to Vancouver to attend the University of British Columbia where she received a degree in cell biology and genetics.

Filmography

Film

Television

References

External links

SandySidhu.com

Living people
1992 births
21st-century Canadian actresses
Actresses from British Columbia
Canadian people of Punjabi descent
Canadian television actresses
People from Nanaimo
University of British Columbia Faculty of Science alumni